= Manuel Gonçalves =

Portuguese footballer

Varela
Personal information
- Full name: Manuel Gonçalves
- Date of birth: Unknown
- Place of birth: Portugal
- Date of death: Deceased
- Position: Midfielder

Senior career*
Years	Team	Apps	(Gls)
1927–1930	Sporting CP		

International career
1926–1929	Portugal	3	(0)
- * Club domestic league appearances and goals

Manuel Gonçalves (born unknown - deceased) known as Varela, was a Portuguese footballer who played as a midfielder.
